Morshedabad may refer to:

Morshedabad (33°49′ N 48°12′ E), Selseleh
Morshedabad (33°50′ N 48°14′ E), Selseleh